José St. Claire (born in 1916), better known as Pepe Lucas, was a Dominican professional baseball player. He was better known for a home-run which occurred on February 17, 1951, which became known across the Caribbean as the "Pepelucazo". That home-run also became known as "the shot heard around the Caribbean".

Pepelucazo 
On Saturday, February 17, 1951, St. Claire's team, the Cangrejeros de Santurce, were playing against the Criollos de Caguas y Guayama in Game Seven of the 1951 Puerto Rican league's final championship series. The Cangrejeros were vying for their first professional title, but the game was tied at two runs a side. With two outs in the bottom of the ninth inning, St. Claire came to bat. After a strike on the first pitch, he launched the second pitch of Caguas pitcher Mike Clark beyond the playing field for a homerun, giving Santurce the victory and winning the team their first championship.

16,700 people were present when St. Claire hit the homerun.

At the 1951 Caribbean World Series, held in Caracas, Venezuela, St. Claire and the Cangrejeros won the Series championship.

Hall of Fame 
St. Claire, who also played in Cuba, Colombia, the Dominican Republic, Mexico and Venezuela professionally, was chosen as the best Dominican Republic first baseman of all time in 1972. Two years later, in 1974, he was inducted into the Dominican Republic's Sports Hall of Fame.

References 

1916 births
Dominican Republic baseball players
Year of death missing
Dominican Republic expatriate baseball players in Puerto Rico
Dominican Republic expatriate baseball players in Cuba
Dominican Republic expatriate baseball players in Mexico
Dominican Republic expatriate baseball players in Venezuela
Dominican Republic expatriate baseball players in Colombia